Jamal Damain Reiners (born 19 May 1998) is an Australian professional footballer who plays as a striker for ECU Joondalup.

Playing career 
He came through Western Australia's National Training Centre and he has featured in Australian under 16 and under 17 tours and tournaments in Italy and Hong Kong. In 2014, he was one of 24 scholars accepted at Football Federation of Australia's (FFA) Centre of Excellence at the Australian Institute of Sport (AIS).

Perth Glory 
Reiners signed with Perth Glory on 25 October 2015 at the age of 17. Reiners earned his starting debut for Perth Glory on 16 December 2015 against defending champions, Melbourne Victory. He set up Diego Castro for the winner in the 74th minute of that game.

References

External links

Living people
1998 births
Association football forwards
Australian soccer players
South African soccer players
Perth Glory FC players
A-League Men players